The 41st Yasar Dogu Tournament 2013, was a wrestling event held in Ankara, Turkey between 09 and 10 February 2013.

This international tournament includes competition men's freestyle wrestling. This ranking tournament was held in honor of the two time Olympic Champion, Yaşar Doğu.

Medal overview

Medal table

Men's freestyle

Participating nations

See also
2020 Yasar Dogu Tournament
2019 Yasar Dogu Tournament
2018 Yasar Dogu Tournament
2017 Yasar Dogu Tournament
2016 Yasar Dogu Tournament
2015 Yasar Dogu Tournament
2014 Yasar Dogu Tournament
2012 Yasar Dogu Tournament
2011 Yasar Dogu Tournament

References 

Yasar Dogu 2013
2013 in sport wrestling
Sports competitions in Ankara
Yaşar Doğu Tournament
International wrestling competitions hosted by Turkey